The Perth Amboy and Woodbridge Railroad was a railroad operated by the Pennsylvania Railroad (PRR). The line began along the PRR main at Union Tower in Rahway, New Jersey. The line ended at the now-closed Essay Tower in South Amboy, New Jersey. The rail line was double tracked and was used for both freight and passenger service. At Essay, it would become the New York and Long Branch Railroad which would run to Bay Head Junction. At Essay traffic from the main or the South Amboy engine facility to the holding track outside the station. Essay also controlled traffic on the Camden and Amboy Railroad today known as the Amboy Secondary Track.

Today 
Today this line is part of New Jersey Transit's North Jersey Coast Line, which operates into New York's Pennsylvania Station. This line is controlled by the NJ Transit North Jersey Coast Line Dispatcher from Graw interlocking (inclusive), to the west. Amtrak CETC-9 controls from Graw (exclusive) east into Amtrak's Union Interlocking. Between Perth Amboy, New Jersey and South Amboy, New Jersey the main line crosses the Raritan Bay Drawbridge over the Raritan River.

References

External links
Corporate Genealogy: Perth Amboy and Woodbridge

Pennsylvania Railroad lines
Defunct New Jersey railroads
Railway companies established in 1864
Transportation in Middlesex County, New Jersey
Woodbridge Township, New Jersey
Perth Amboy, New Jersey